The 1961–62 Romanian Hockey League season was the 32nd season of the Romanian Hockey League. Four teams participated in the league, and CCA Bucuresti won the championship.

Regular season

External links
hochei.net

Rom
Romanian Hockey League seasons
1961–62 in Romanian ice hockey